Senator McKenzie may refer to:

Andy McKenzie (born 1970), West Virginia State Senate
Curt McKenzie (born 1969), Idaho State Senate
Henry McKenzie (1882–1974), Florida State Senate
John C. McKenzie (1860–1941), Illinois State Senate
Bridget McKenzie (1969-), Senator for Victoria in the Parliament of Australia

See also
Ronald MacKenzie (born 1934), Massachusetts State Senate